"Nothing in Common" is the 2012 English language follow-up single by the Christopher to his debut "Against the Odds". It was released on EMI Denmark as a prerelease for an upcoming album.

Chart performance
The single hit the Tracklisten, the official Danish Singles Chart in its initial week of release reaching #5.

References

2012 singles
Christopher (singer) songs
2011 songs
EMI Records singles